The 2004 Iowa Hawkeyes football team represented the University of Iowa in the 2004 NCAA Division I-A football season. They played their home games in Kinnick Stadium and were coached by Kirk Ferentz. Finishing the 2003 season with a 10–3 record and an Outback Bowl victory, the Hawkeyes began the season 2–0 with wins over Kent State and Iowa State. But after rocky performances at Arizona State and Michigan, the Hawkeyes sat at 2–2 going into their game with Michigan State.

The Hawkeyes handily defeated the Spartans 38–16, and turned their attention to Ohio State, a team whom the Hawkeyes had not beaten at home since 1983. Behind a strong defensive performance that allowed only 177 yards, the Hawkeyes easily defeated the Buckeyes by 26 points, the largest margin of victory over Ohio State in Iowa history at the time. However, tragedy struck soon thereafter, when head coach Kirk Ferentz's father died. In the emotional game that ensued, the Hawkeyes narrowly defeated Penn State 6–4 on two Kyle Schlicher field goals.

The Hawkeyes then raised their record to 8–2 with victories over Illinois, Purdue, and Minnesota. With a share of the Big Ten championship on the line, the Hawkeyes met Wisconsin in the final regular season game of the year. Iowa won the game, completing its second consecutive unbeaten season at home, and thousands of Hawkeye fans swarmed the field in celebration. Several weeks following the victory, Iowa accepted a bid to play the LSU Tigers in the 2005 Capital One Bowl.

In a game that was originally thought to be a defensive matchup,  the Hawkeyes took a 24–12 lead early in the fourth quarter. But behind freshman quarterback JaMarcus Russell, the Tigers stormed back, and took a one-point lead with 46 seconds remaining. However, LSU's comeback was all for naught, as Iowa's Drew Tate completed a 56-yard touchdown pass to Warren Holloway as time expired, giving Iowa the 30–25 win and a 10–2 final record.

Previous season

In 2003, Iowa began the season 4–0 and would eventually complete the regular season with a 9–3 record that included wins over Iowa State, Michigan (Iowa's second straight victory against Michigan), and Minnesota. However, the Hawkeyes lost to Michigan State, Ohio State, and Purdue. Finishing fourth in the Big Ten standings, the Hawkeyes accepted a bid to play the Florida Gators in the Outback Bowl. Despite falling behind early on a 70-yard touchdown pass from Chris Leak to Kelvin Knight, the Hawkeyes reeled off 27 straight points en route to a 37–17 victory. It was a milestone victory, as it gave Iowa its second consecutive 10-win season along with the first Hawkeye victory in a January bowl game since the Rose Bowl in 1959.

Following the season, five Iowa players were selected in the 2004 NFL Draft. Robert Gallery, the 2003 Outland Trophy winner, became the second-highest pick in school history when he was selected 2nd by the Oakland Raiders. Following Gallery in Iowa's draft order were Bob Sanders, taken 44th by Indianapolis, Nate Kaeding, taken 65th by San Diego, Jared Clauss, taken in the seventh round by Tennessee, and Erik Jensen, who was taken in the seventh round by St. Louis.

Before the season
Prior to the season, the Hawkeyes looked to replace seven offensive starters and four defensive starters. Key losses from 2003 included Maurice Brown, Robert Gallery, Nate Chandler, Fred Russell, and Ramon Ochoa on offense. Defensively, the Hawkeyes looked to replace Howard Hodges, Jared Clauss, Grant Steen, and Bob Sanders.

Replacement starters on offense were Drew Tate, Champ Davis, Jermelle Lewis, Calvin Davis, Tony Jackson, Lee Gray, Mike Elgin, and Chris Felder. On defense, Derreck Robinson, Tyler Luebke, George Lewis, and Marcus Paschal assumed their roles on the starting lineup. On special teams, David Bradley returned for his senior season as punter, while Kyle Schlicher replaced Nate Kaeding as the starting kicker.

Preseason Rankings
 NationalChamps.net – 12th
 USA today – 12th
 SI.com – 15th
 AP top 25 – 19th

Recruiting class
Iowa signed 21 players on National Signing Day, which was February 4, 2004. The Hawkeyes added other late commits to the class with the late additions of defensive lineman Ettore Ewen .

Another recruit, Kyle Williams, later de-committed from the Hawkeyes and committed to the Purdue Boilermakers.

Schedule

Schedule note
Due to the Big Ten's rotating schedule, the Hawkeyes did not play either Northwestern or Indiana.

Strength of schedule rankings
 FootballFantasy.com – 13th
 Russell rankings – 18th
 AndersonSports – 18th

Roster

Coaching staff

Rankings

Game summaries

Kent State

Source: Box Score

Iowa State

Source: Box Score

Arizona State

Source: Box Score

Michigan 

Source: Box Score

Michigan State

Source: Box Score

Ohio State

Source: Box Score
    
    
    
    
    
    
    

Kirk Ferentz was able to get his first win over Ohio State in this dominant victory. Iowa's defense was relentless and held the Buckeyes to just 27 yards rushing on 29 attempts. Additionally, Ohio State only ran six plays in Hawkeye territory through the first three quarters of the game. Sophomore quarterback Drew Tate had four touchdowns (1 rushing).

Penn State

Source: Box Score
    
    
    
    

Iowa's first win without a touchdown since beating Michigan in 1985.

Illinois

Source: Box Score

Purdue

Source: Box Score

Minnesota

Source: Box Score

In one of the more unlikely victories of the season, Iowa traveled to the Metrodome to challenge the Golden Gophers powerful rushing duo of Marion Barber III and Laurence Maroney.  The Hawkeye defense came into the game rated #1 in the country in rushing defense.

Despite that, the Gopher tandem shredded the Hawkeye defense with the Gophers outrushing Iowa by an outlandish margin of 338 to 6 in yards gained.  The Hawkeyes prevailed however behind the deft passing and scrambling of sophomore quarterback Drew Tate, a pass defense that held the Gophers to 64 yards through the air and forced three turnovers, and Iowa's sophomore place-kicker Kyle Schlicher, who was a perfect 5–5 in field goals.

The Hawkeyes led virtually the entire game, but needed a huge defensive stop in the closing minutes, with Jr. linebacker Chad Greenway stopping Marion Barber III for a key loss on 2nd down in Iowa territory and eventually forcing Minnesota to attempt a 51-yard field goal, trailing by two.  Although Gopher placekicker Rhyss Lloyd had won three games in his career with last-minute field goals, this time his attempt shanked wide.

QB Drew Tate then guided the Hawks to one closing first down with the help of an offside penalty on Minnesota, and the Hawks survived, winning their sixth consecutive game, all against Big 10 teams.  By the time the Hawkeyes kicked off in their next (and final) regular-season game, they learned they would be playing for a portion of the Big Ten title.

Wisconsin

Source: Box Score
    
    
    
    
    
    
    

Iowa clinched a share of Big Ten title with this victory over Wisconsin. The Hawkeyes' defense was smothering, holding a top-ten Badger team to just seven points. Fans rushed the field as it capped off a historic run and an undefeated home season.

Capital One Bowl

Source: Box Score
    
    
    
    
    
    
    
    
    
    

LSU would not go away in this back-and-forth bowl game. The Tigers took the lead with under a minute to play. Drew Tate was able to find Warren Holloway for a 56-yard pass as time expired to give the Hawkeyes a miracle victory which would become to be known as "The Catch" among Iowa fans.

Postseason awards

Team players in the 2005 NFL draft

References

Iowa
Iowa Hawkeyes football seasons
Big Ten Conference football champion seasons
Citrus Bowl champion seasons
Iowa Hawkeyes football